Bossa Nova (subtitled: Bossa Nova and the Rise of Brazilian Music in the 1960s) is a 2011 compilation album released by Soul Jazz Records. It was released to positive reviews from The Guardian, The Independent and The Observer.

Reception

Robin Denselow praised the album, stating that the album "bravely attempts to provide an overview, while leaving out some of the obvious classics." noting the lack of songs like Desafinado or Aguas de Março, let alone "Girl from Ipanema" while artists like Carlos Lyra "doesn't even get a mention." Denselow followed this up stating "No matter, for there's other great music".
Nick Coleman of The Independent praised the album as "an exemplary account of how Brazilian music found its keenest popular focus in the 1960s" Neil Spencer of The Observer'' praised the album as a "dazzling 2CD set" noting it's hybrid of artists like Elis Regina and Jorge Ben with "edgier creations", noting Baden Powell's song "Canto De Ossanha".

Track listing

References

Sources
 
 
 

2011 compilation albums
Soul Jazz Records compilation albums
Bossa nova albums